Drobisch is a surname. Notable people with the surname include:

 Karl Ludwig Drobisch (1803–1854) was German composer, music theorist and church musician
  (born 1931), German historian
 Moritz Wilhelm Drobisch (1802–1896) was a German mathematician, logician, psychologist and philosopher
 Till Drobisch (born 1993), Namibian racing cyclist

Surnames